Coming Home is the eighth studio album by American singer Lionel Richie. It was released by The Island Def Jam Music Group on September 12, 2006 in the United States. A breakaway from his previous albums and their adult contemporary sounds, Richie and executive producer Antonio "L.A." Reid recruited a number of sought-after producers and songwriters from the contemporary R&B and hip-hop genres to work with him on the album, including Dallas Austin, Jerry Duplessis, Jermaine Dupri, Sean Garrett, Wyclef Jean, Rodney Jerkins, and Norwegian duo Stargate.

The album earned a generally mixed reception from music critics, who either complimented or dismissed Richie's decision to update his sound. In the United States, Coming Home debuted at number six on the US Billboard 200, becoming his biggest hit album since 1986's Dancing on the Ceiling, while selling up to 449,000 copies. Elsewhere, it reprised the chart success of Renaissance (2000) and Just for You (2004), entering the top ten in Germany and Switzerland and going gold in the United Kingdom. Coming Home produced several singles, including "I Call It Love" and "Why."

Critical reception

Entertainment Weekly critic Michael Endelman felt that while "Richie collaborates with producers who are young enough to be his kids in a bid to update his quiet-storm sound for modern R&B ears [...] The move pays off, as Richie’s silky voice glides through tracks [...] But dentists of America, don’t fret: The ’80s soft-pop titan hedges his bets by also including plenty of his trademark banal ballads. AllMusic editor Andy Kellman found that "too much of Coming Home is merely pleasant – particularly the adult contemporary fare, with the exception of "I Love You" – or too conscious of remaining with the times. While the likes of "Why" and "Up All Night" involved Richie's songwriting in some capacity, just about any twentysomething vocalist could be fronting them; the same goes for the Jermaine Dupri-produced "What You Are." The stab at emotionally cleansing reggae of the Bob Marley variety, "Stand Down," comes up short as well. That said, at least half the album should satisfy Richie's longtime followers."

Chart performance
In the United States, Coming Home debuted and peaked at number six on the Billboard 200.  It sold over 75,000 copies in its first week and marked Richie's first top 10 album debut of his career. In February 2007, the album was certified gold for the shipment of 500,000 units, and in May 2012 it surpassed the 449,000 mark.

Track listing 

Notes
 signifies an assistant producer

Charts

Weekly charts

Year-end charts

Certifications and sales

References 

2006 albums
Lionel Richie albums
Albums produced by Chuckii Booker
Albums produced by Dallas Austin
Albums produced by Rodney Jerkins
Albums produced by Jermaine Dupri
Albums produced by Raphael Saadiq
Albums produced by Sean Garrett
Albums produced by Stargate
Albums produced by Wyclef Jean
Island Records albums